Atatürk Monument is a statue depicting Mustafa Kemal Atatürk, the founder of the Republic of Turkey, in Mersin, Turkey.

Geography
Mersin Halkevi is to the northwest and İsmet İnönü Boulevard is to the southeast of the square.

History
Tevfik Sırrı Gür, the governor of Mersin Province in office between 1943 and 1947, was instrumental in building the monument.  
It was erected in 1944 on 23 April, the 24th anniversary of the foundation of Turkish parliament. Its creator was Turkish sculpture professor Kenan Yontunç, who had created a number of Atatürk statues before.

Technical details

The monument is a composed of a marble dais and a bronze statue of Atatürk, the founder of modern Turkey in military uniform.
The dais is a raised platform which is situated in front of the statue.

See also
Atatürk monuments and memorials

References

Buildings and structures in Mersin
Mersin
Buildings and structures completed in 1944
Bronze sculptures in Turkey